Lindsay Eastwood (born January 14, 1997) is a Canadian ice hockey defender, currently playing for the Toronto Six in the Premier Hockey Federation (PHF). The Syracuse Orange all-time leader in goals scored among defenders, she scored the first goal in Six history.

Playing career 
Born and raised in Kanata, Ontario, Eastwood began playing hockey at the age of six. She played junior hockey for the Nepean Wildcats in the Provincial Women's Hockey League (PWHL), serving as team captain and finishing as one of the top five all-time league scorers among defenceman.

She would go on to play NCAA Division I women's ice hockey for the Syracuse Orange of College Hockey America, putting up 75 points in 135 games. She was forced to sit out her first year at the university after being diagnosed with antiphospholipid syndrome, an autoimmune disorder. In that season, she began training as a rower, but was able to return to hockey for the 2016–17 season. In 2018, she was named Syracuse captain, and led the team to victory at the 2019 CHA Women's Ice Hockey Tournament, the programme's first ever conference championship win. In her final university season, she won the CHA Best Defenseman Award and the Doris R. Soladay Award, setting a programme record for most career goals by a defenceman.

Professional
In June 2020, she signed her first professional contract with the Toronto Six, the first Canadian expansion team in the NWHL. She scored her first professional goal against Amanda Leveille in the second game of the 2020–21 NWHL season, the first goal in the Six franchise history. The assists on Eastwood's historic goal were credited to Emma Woods and Shiann Darkangelo.

International career 
Eastwood played for Team Canada at the 2015 IIHF World Women's U18 Championship, joining a team that included future NWHLers Carly Jackson, Alyson Matteau, and future Toronto Six teammate Sarah-Ève Coutu-Godbout, in addition to future Canadian women's national team players Sarah Potomak and Micah Hart, and many other standout players. The team won silver after falling in the gold medal game to Team USA in overtime.

Style of play 
Mostly described as a more offensive defender, Eastwood has been noted for her size, reach, and the strength of her shot. She has stated that "my speed is one of my biggest insecurities as a player."

Personal life 
Eastwood holds two degrees from Syracuse University, a bachelor's in communication and rhetorical studies from the College of Visual and Performing Arts and a master's degree in television, radio and film from the S. I. Newhouse School of Public Communications. She covered the 2020 Stanley Cup playoffs as a correspondent for the Tampa Bay Times and will be covering her experiences inside the 2020–21 NWHL COVID-19 bubble season for Sportsnet.

Her uncle, Mike Eastwood, played over 700 game in the men's National Hockey League in the 1990s and early 2000s.

Career Statistics

References

External links 
 

1997 births
Living people
Canadian sports journalists
Canadian women's ice hockey defencemen
Ice hockey people from Ottawa
Journalists from Ontario
S.I. Newhouse School of Public Communications alumni
Syracuse Orange women's ice hockey players
Tampa Bay Times
Toronto Six players